The 2021–22 season was FC Ararat-Armenia's 4th season in Armenian Premier League, in which they finished runners-up to Pyunik by one point and where knocked out of the Armenian Cup by eventual winners Noravank.

Season events
On 24 June, Ararat-Armenia announced the signing of Valerio Vimercati from Noah. The following day, 25 June, Ararat-Armenia announced the signing of Wilfried Eza from Van.

On 6 July, Ararat-Armenia announced the return of Mailson Lima from Dibba Al-Hisn, with Alwyn Tera joining from Saburtalo on 9 July.

On 4 August, Ararat-Armenia announced the signing of Karen Muradyan on a free transfer after his contract with Ararat Yerevan had expired.

On 5 August, Ararat-Armenia announced the signing of Diego Barboza from Enosis Neon Paralimni.

On 12 October, Yoan Gouffran announced his retirement from football.

On 9 January, Ararat-Armenia announced that Dan Spătaru had left the club after his contract had expired.

On 25 January, Ararat-Armenia announced the signing of Romércio from Remo.

On 29 January, Ararat-Armenia announced the signings of Thibaut Lesquoy from Almere City and Jonathan Duarte from Orsomarso. The following day, 30 January, Solomon Udo joined from Shakhter Karagandy.

Squad

Out on loan

Transfers

In

Out

Loans out

Released

Friendlies

Competitions

Overall record

Premier League

Results summary

Results by round

Results

Table

Armenian Cup

Statistics

Appearances and goals

|-
|colspan="16"|Players away on loan:

|-
|colspan="16"|Players who left Ararat-Armenia during the season:

|}

Goal scorers

Clean sheets

Disciplinary Record

References

FC Ararat-Armenia seasons
Ararat-Armenia